The Sony FX30 (ILME-FX30) is Sony's first semi-professional APS-C mirrorless interchangeable-lens cinema camera in their Cinema Line. It was announced on September 28, 2022 and released in the following month. The FX30 is based on the full-frame FX3 released in the previous year. The starting price of $1800 (USD) makes it the most affordable model in Sony's Cinema Line, and it offers a step-up in video potential for the APS-C lineup. The camera has been acclaimed for its performance.

Features

Features 

 Back-illuminated Exmor R APS-C CMOS sensor
 S-Cinetone Picture Profile
 BIONZ XR processor
 H.265 10-bit 4:2:2 video codec
 Dual-Base ISO
 Dynamic range of 14+ stops
 16-bit Raw video ouput
 High-speed rates of 60p in 4K and 120p in HD, 240p in S&Q
 Ability to preview user LUTs on LCD
 Real time Eye/Face AF
 Focus Assist & Focus Map features
 Active Mode Image Stabilization
 Tally Lamp while recording
 XLR audio inputs
 No EVF available

Limitations compared to FX3 

 Larger sensor resolution, smaller pixels, lower performance in low light situations

 120p video mode is not available
 Smaller dynamic range (14+ vs 15+ steps)
 Different Base ISO (High Base ISO 2500 vs 12800)

Shared FX3/A7S III Attributes 

 Compatible XLR handle (for professional audio)
 5-axis in-body image stabilization
 16-bit raw output via HDMI
 S-Log3 Picture Profile
 Vari-angle touch screen LCD
 New Sony Menu

Zoom lever button (like on other professional devices) 
Usually this button would be the Turn ON/Turn OFF button. On ILME-FX30 Sony managed to put a Zoom lever which helps zooming in and out while recording. In menu there is an option to set it's sensivity and speed.

See also 
 List of Sony E-mount cameras
 Sony FX3
 Sony A7S III

References

External links 

 

Sony ILME-FX3
Cameras introduced in 2021
Full-frame mirrorless interchangeable lens cameras